The 1933 Calgary municipal election was held on November 22, 1933 to elect a Mayor and six Aldermen to sit on Calgary City Council. Along with positions on Calgary City Council, a Commissioner, three trustees for the Public School Board, and two trustees for the Separate School Board.

Calgary City Council governed under "Initiative, Referendum and Recall" which is composed of a Mayor, Commissioner and twelve Aldermen all elected to staggered two year terms. Commissioner Thomas B. Riley and six Aldermen: Peter Turner Bone, William Ayer Lincoln, Robert Henry Parkyn, John Walker Russell, Fred J. White, and Harry Humble elected in 1932 continued in their positions.

Background
The election was held under the Single Transferable Voting/Proportional Representation (STV/PR) with the term for candidates being two years. The total ballots cast in the election reached 23,681 which was the highest in Calgary history, over 5,000 more than the previous record in 1931.

Results
Results from Calgary Daily Herald.

Mayor

Council
Quota for election was 3,286.

Public School Board
The quota was 3,053

Separate school board

Plebiscites

Elimination of Recall
For the elimination of recall provisions in the City Charter.
For - 12,131
Against - 8,758

Fire department hours
To provide fire fighters one day off in a seven-day week.
For - 11,384
Against - 11,227

See also
List of Calgary municipal elections

References

1930s in Calgary
Municipal elections in Calgary
1933 elections in Canada